The Royal Cayman Islands Police Service (RCIPS) is the standing police force of the British Overseas Territory of the Cayman Islands. The police force was formed in 1907 and currently (2009) stands at 343 enlisted officers, tasked with tackling Crime in the Cayman Islands.

The Royal Cayman Islands Police Service serves all three of the Cayman Islands, namely, Grand Cayman, Cayman Brac and Little Cayman. Demographically, the 2021 census reported the population of the Cayman Islands to be 69,656, representing a mix of more than 100 nationalities. The vast majority of people reside on Grand Cayman with Cayman Brac being the second most populated with about 2,000 residents, followed by Little Cayman with around 200 permanent residents.

Against this backdrop the RCIPS deals with more than 22,000 calls for assistance every year, as well as proactively patrolling the streets 24-hours a day, seven days a week. It has a history of actively recruiting police officers from other nations with at least five years' experience.

Structure and ranks
The RCIPS is headed by a Commissioner, assisted by up to two Deputy Commissioners. Other executive officers hold the ranks of Chief Superintendent and Superintendent. Each of the four policing Districts is headed by a Chief Inspector, assisted by an Inspector (except in the smallest District, which covers the two smaller islands). Inspectors are responsible for neighbourhood teams consisting of Sergeants and Constables. In addition to neighbourhood policing, officers are assigned to the Criminal Investigation Department (CID) with ranks (up to Chief Superintendent) prefixed with the word 'Detective'. There are also a number of specialist units.

The RCIPS engages Special Constables (“Specials”), who are unpaid volunteer police officers, to support the work of full-time officers. There are powers to appoint Auxiliary Constables to specialist roles. Special Constables may advance to the rank of Special Sergeant, and also have their own Commandant, with a Deputy and an Assistant.

The prefix “detective” is given to officers who are assigned to the CID, after completing the necessary selection and training process. Detective ranks run parallel to uniformed ranks, and range from Detective Constable to Detective Superintendent.

List of Ranks
Commissioner
Deputy Commissioner
Chief Superintendent
Superintendent
Chief Inspector
Inspector
Sergeant
Constable
Training
Recruit
Other
Auxiliary Constable and Special Constable

Police Districts
For purposes of criminal investigation, neighbourhood policing, and crime prevention, the RCIPS is divided into four Districts:
 West Bay, with one police station at West Bay.
 George Town, with one police station at George Town (Elgin Avenue).
 Eastern District, with three police stations at East End, Bodden Town, and North Side.
 Cayman Brac and Little Cayman, with two police stations, one on each island.

In addition to the Elgin Avenue police station in George Town, several other operational police bases exist in the town, including the national police headquarters in Shedden Road, the traffic policing unit in Lindhurst Avenue, and administrative offices on Walkers Road.

Specialist departments
The RCIPS has a number of specialist departments, beyond the CID and the neighbourhood policing teams. Of these, the most visible and sizeable are the following.

Air Operations Unit
The Air Operations Unit (AOU) provides aerial support for border security, search and rescue, police operations, and disaster response. The AOU has a uniformed civilian Executive Officer, and is staffed by professional pilots and engineers, as well as police officers, led by a sergeant. The AOU was founded in 2010.

The AOU started with a Eurocopter EC135 police helicopter. This original aircraft was withdrawn after a failure in service in February 2019. The AOU now operates the Airbus Helicopters, Inc. H145 helicopters.

The AOU now operates two Airbus H-145 helicopters (formerly the Eurocopter EC-145), acquired in a special deal with the United Kingdom in late March 2019, and early December 2019.

Joint Marine Unit (NOW HANDED OVER TO CAYMAN ISLANDS COAST GUARD)
(See Cayman Islands Coast Guard )
 
This unit has been replaced by the CICG in 2020 (Cayman Islands Coast Guard) which operate a fleet of fast motor boats to provide law enforcement, maritime customs control, maritime immigration control, and search and rescue operations.

Firearms Response Unit
The FRU is a paramilitary force within the RCIPS, whose officers are trained to high standards of fitness, and to an advanced level of firearms training. The FRU provides operational support as required, and is also the frontline of defence against organised violent crime and terrorism threats.

Equipment

Duty Gear
The Royal Cayman Islands Police Service in Majority is an unarmed police Service.

A Regular Uniformed Police Officer would carry a duty belt with Handcuffs, Pepper Spray, and collapsible baton, and radio, at time wears a stab vest.

An Air Operations Unit Officer's Uniform before would have normally consisted of Hi-Vis Yellow with black and reflective grey striped polo and Dark Blue Tactical Trousers and boots and a Coyote Tan flight suit. In more recent years the AOU has been using Dark Blue Polo shirts and Tactical Coyote Tan Trousers and boots, along with relevant gear for pilots and air crew. 

In many cases officers in Criminal Investigations are plain clothed officers and would typically wear clothes that would be suited for Professional Business Attire. Crime Scene Investigation Unit (CSIU) personnel would also have the relevant forensic gear to carry out their work. 

A K-9 Officer's Uniform is the same Tactical Dark Blue/Black that the FRU had used prior to 2022. K-9 officers are also equipped with tactical Plate Carriers and relevant equipment for their dogs along with the standard gear. The K-9 Unit normally operate with Malinois or German Shepherds dogs. 

However, The Royal Cayman Islands Police Service has the Firearms Response Unit which is an Armed unit within the Police Service.

Officers within the Firearms Response Unit can be seen with Handcuffs or Speedcuffs, Pepper Spray, collapsible baton, and radio along with Taser X26 and carry H&K MP5 or H&K G36C and Springfield Armory XD and instead of the normal stab vest officers can be seen wearing tactical Plate Carriers and Kevlar Helmets. 

As of June 2022, FRU Updated their Uniform from the Tactical Dark Blue/Black which resembles some of the Uniforms of other unit in the Service like K-9 as well as other agencies like the Cayman Islands Coast Guard and CBC, to a Tactical Grey uniform which would distinguish the FRU from any other unit or agency. Along with the new uniform the FRU also updated to a newer type of Plate Carrier and Ballistic Helmet.     The Tactical Grey Uniform is similar to other Tactical Grey Uniforms for specialist tactical units in other countries like Canada's Emergency Task Force (ETF) (Toronto Police Force) and United Kingdom's Counter Terrorist Specialist Firearms Officer (CT-FSO) part of the Metropolitan Police Specialist Firearms Command (SCO19).

Vehicles

 Ford Police Interceptor Sedan Taurus
 Ford Crown Victoria Police Interceptor
 Chevrolet Impala
 Dodge Charger Pursuit
 Ford Police Interceptor Utility Explorer
 Chevrolet Tahoe
 Land Rover Discovery
 Mercedes-Benz Sprinter 
 Ford F-Series
 Eco Charger E-ATV

References

External links

 

Cayman Islands
Government of the Cayman Islands
Society of the Cayman Islands
Organizations established in 1907
1907 establishments in Jamaica